Sonia Torihuano Flores (born 28 November 1991) is a Bolivian futsal player and a footballer who plays as a midfielder. She has been a member of the Bolivia women's national team.

Early life
Torihuano hails from the Chuquisaca Department.

International career
Torihuano played for Bolivia at senior level in the 2014 Copa América Femenina.

References

1991 births
Living people
Women's association football midfielders
Bolivian women's footballers
People from Chuquisaca Department
Bolivia women's international footballers
Bolivian women's futsal players
South American Games bronze medalists for Bolivia
Competitors at the 2018 South American Games